Willi Willwohl (born 31 August 1994 in Cottbus) is a German former cyclist.

Major results

2012
 2nd Road race, National Junior Road Championships
 4th Overall Tour de la Region de Lodz
 6th Overall 3-Etappen-Rundfahrt
2013
 Tour de Berlin
1st Stages 3, 4 & 5
 1st Stage 6 Dookoła Mazowsza
2014
 1st Stage 1 Carpathian Couriers Race
 6th Velothon Berlin
 7th Rund um Köln
2015
 1st Stage 1 Tour du Loir-et-Cher
 1st Stage 3 Dookoła Mazowsza
2016
 3rd Road race, National Under-23 Road Championships
 7th Road race, National Road Championships

References

External links

1994 births
Living people
German male cyclists
Sportspeople from Cottbus
Cyclists from Brandenburg